Isoceras bipunctatum is a moth in the family Cossidae. It was described by Staudinger in 1887. It is found in Georgia, Azerbaijan, Turkey, Iran, Lebanon, Jordan, Syria, Israel and Iraq.

References

Natural History Museum Lepidoptera generic names catalog

Cossinae
Moths described in 1887
Moths of Europe
Moths of Asia